Bixby Creek is a stream in the U.S. state of California.

See also 
 List of rivers of California

References 

Rivers of Northern California
Rivers of Monterey County, California